The 2019 Punta Open was a professional tennis tournament played on clay courts. It was the second edition of the tournament which was part of the 2019 ATP Challenger Tour. It took place in Punta del Este, Uruguay between 21 and 27 January 2019.

Singles main-draw entrants

Seeds

 1 Rankings are as of 14 January 2019.

Other entrants
The following players received wildcards into the singles main draw:
  Guido Andreozzi
  Preston Brown
  Facundo Díaz Acosta
  Tomás Lipovšek Puches
  Francisco Llanes

The following players received entry into the singles main draw as alternates:
  Jordi Arconada
  Oscar José Gutierrez

The following players received entry into the singles main draw using their ITF World Tennis Ranking:
  Hernán Casanova
  Matías Franco Descotte
  Camilo Ugo Carabelli
  Gonzalo Villanueva

The following players received entry from the qualifying draw:
  Alejandro Tabilo
  Matías Zukas

Champions

Singles

 Thiago Monteiro def.  Facundo Argüello 3–6, 6–2, 6–3.

Doubles

 Guido Andreozzi /  Guillermo Durán def.  Sander Gillé /  Joran Vliegen 6–2, 6–7(6–8), [10–8].

2019 ATP Challenger Tour
Tennis tournaments in Uruguay
2019 in Uruguayan tennis
January 2019 sports events in South America
Punta Open